Bercow  is a surname.

People
 John Bercow (born 1963), British politician and speaker of the House of Commons (2009-2019)
 Sally Bercow (née Illman), the wife of John Bercow

See also 
 Bercu (disambiguation)
 Berkhof (surname)
 Berko (disambiguation)
 Berkoff
 Berkov
 Berkowitz
 Berkovich

Jewish surnames
Surnames of Polish origin